Peninsula (marketed internationally as Train to Busan Presents: Peninsula and also known as Train to Busan 2) is a 2020 South Korean action horror heist film co-written and directed by Yeon Sang-ho. It is a standalone sequel to the 2016 film Train to Busan, the second live-action feature film and third overall installment in the film series of the same name. The plot follows a former soldier who is sent along with a team to retrieve a truck full of money from the wastelands of the Korean peninsula now inhabited by zombies, rogue militia, and a family. The film stars an ensemble cast featuring Gang Dong-won and Lee Jung-hyun.

Peninsula was chosen to premiere in the 2020 Cannes Film Festival, which was cancelled due to the COVID-19 pandemic, and simply released theatrically in South Korea on 15 July 2020, while also being shown in the 25th Busan International Film Festival on 21 October 2020. It has grossed $42.7 million worldwide on a $16 million budget, but received generally mixed reviews from critics, who found it inferior to the first film.

Plot

A zombie outbreak occurs in South Korea, where the government is overwhelmed in a day. Korea Marine Captain Jung-seok drives his family members to a ship. On the way, he encounters a couple with a young daughter, but he refuses their pleas for help as the man is bleeding. Jung-seok's family board a ship where an infected man turns into a zombie and infects several people in a cabin, including unfortunately Jung-seok's nephew Dong-hwan. Jung-seok's sister refuses to leave Dong-hwan who has an infected tummy, so Jung-seok closes off the cabin while zombies bite her. Jung-seok stops his brother-in-law Chul-min from entering as armed soldiers arrive. Other nations including the United States and NATO contain the outbreak by quarantining South Korea.

Four years later in Hong Kong, a guilt-ridden Jung-seok and Chul-min are recruited by Chinese mobsters for a mission with two other Koreans to return to South Korea and retrieve a truck containing US$20 million; if successful, they will supposedly receive half of the money. The team arrives at the peninsula at night by boat and finds the truck. The team fends off and kills the zombie truck driver, making noises that attract more zombies. Jung-seok shoots several, and the team escapes.

On the way back to Incheon Port, the team is ambushed by a rogue militia, Unit 631, which uses light to attract more zombies, leading to the team crashing their vehicles. Jung-seok is thrown out of the truck while Chul-min hides in it. The other members of the team are killed, one due to the crash, and one by Unit 631 leader Sergeant Hwang. Jung-seok is rescued by two sisters in a car: Joon, a skilled driver who is adept at manipulating and killing zombies, and young Yu-jin. They return to their hideout, joining their grandfather Elder Kim and mother Min-jung. Jung-Seok realizes Min-jung and Yu-jin were part of the family he refused to help four years ago.

Meanwhile, Unit 631 take the truck to their compound. They imprison Chul-min, forcing him to take part in two-minute survival games between unarmed prisoners and the zombies. Private Kim discovers the truck's cash and informs Captain Seo, who contacts the mobsters and hatches a plan to escape the peninsula with the truck, keeping the plan a secret from the rest of Unit 631. Meanwhile, Min-jung learns from Jung-seok that the mobsters' ship is at Incheon Port waiting to extract him and the truck. She decides to steal the truck to escape with her family and Jung-seok.

The following evening, Jung-seok and Min-jung attempt to steal the truck. While holding Private Kim at gunpoint, Jung-seok learns that Chul-min is alive, and interrupts a survival game to rescue him, killing several zombies and Unit 631 soldiers. Chul-min saves Jung-seok from being bitten, then Sergeant Hwang kills Chul-min. Min-jung fends off Captain Seo and saves Jung-seok from Unit 631. Min-jung and Jung-seok escape the compound in the truck, but are blocked by zombies. In their car, Joon, Yu-jin and Elder Kim distract the zombies to free the truck.

Using their vehicles, Unit 631 gives chase, while zombies attack the humans. The family and Jung-seok successfully disable the pursuing vehicles, causing Sergeant Hwang to be overwhelmed by zombies. Captain Seo, who had killed Private Kim, ambushes the family at Incheon Port and holds Joon hostage. Yu-jin distracts Seo to free Joon. Elder Kim protects Yu-jin; but Seo mortally shoots him, wounds Min-jung in the leg and escapes with the truck to the ship. The mobsters betray Seo and shoot him. As he dies, Seo reverses the truck to keep the ship's cargo hold open, allowing the zombies outside to enter and kill the mobsters.

The family signals a passing United Nations Chinook helicopter. The injured Min-jung stays behind to clear a path for Jung-seok, Joon and Yu-jin to escape the zombies. They safely reach the helicopter, where U.N. troops refuse to help Min-jung. Surrounded by zombies, Min-jung prepares to kill herself.

Jung-seok remembers Chul-min saying that Jung-seok did not do his best to save their family, and is spurred to help Min-jung. Min-jung decides to live, and she escapes the zombies with Jung-seok's assistance. The family, Jung-seok, and the U.N. troops leave the peninsula in the helicopter.

Cast

Main 
 Gang Dong-won as Jung-seok: A former South Korean Marine Corps Captain, who feels guilt for not saving his nephew and sister.
 Lee Jung-hyun as Min-jung: A mysterious lady who had seen Jung-seok four years back while attempting to get out of Korea.

Supporting 
 Kwon Hae-hyo as Elder Kim: The father of Min-jung, and grandfather of Joon and Yu-jin, who attempts to radio out of Busan.
 Kim Min-jae as Sergeant Hwang: The sergeant of Unit 631 and co-manager of an underground fight club, who leads alongside Seo.
 Koo Kyo-hwan as Captain Seo: The captain of Unit 631 and the cynical head of an underground fight club, who went insane years after the virus ravaged Korea.
 Kim Do-yoon as Chul-min: The brother-in-law of Jung-seok, who helps Jung-seok get the cash.
 Lee Re as Joon: The eldest daughter of Min-jung, who drives an armored car to help survivors.
 Lee Ye-won as Yu-jin: Youngest daughter of Min-jung, who uses loud toy vehicles to draw out zombies and kill them.
 Jang So-yeon as Jung-seok's elder sister: The older sister of Jung-seok, who, refusing to leave her infected son behind, succumbed to the virus four years back.
 Moon Woo-jin as Dong-hwan: Nephew of Jung-seok, who was infected from his tummy four years back, and who Jung-seok regrets for not saving.
 Kim Kyu-baek as Private Kim: The private of Unit 631 and the vice leader of the underground fight club, and Seo's right-hand man.
 Bella Rahim as Major Jane: The Malaysian UN soldier who is the first to rescue the four.

Release 

Peninsula was selected to be shown at the 2020 Cannes Film Festival as part of the Official Slection. However, the festival was eventually cancelled due to the ongoing COVID-19 pandemic. It was theatrically released in South Korea on 15 July 2020, and was also shown in the Panorama section of the 25th Busan International Film Festival on 21 October 2020.  

The film was initially set to release in theaters in the United States on 21 August 2020, but moved to streaming via Shudder and released on 1 April 2021 as "a Shudder exclusive". It was released in India on 27 November, 2020.

Home media 
In the United Kingdom, it was 2020's fourth best-selling foreign language film on physical home video formats (below Parasite, Weathering with You, and Mulan: Legendary Warrior).

Reception

Box office 

, Peninsula has grossed $1.2 million in the United States and Canada, and $41.5 million in other territories (including $28.7 million from South Korea), for a worldwide total of $42.7 million. 

In South Korea, the film made $2.4 million from 2,338 screens on its opening day, the best total of 2020, and $4 million through its first two days of release. It also opened in Taiwan and Singapore, making a combined $905,000 on its first day. The film went on to debut to $13.2 million over its first five days in South Korea, and a total $20.8 million (including $750,000 from 45 IMAX screens) worldwide. It was the first time since mid-March that the global box office totaled over $1 million. After ten days of release, the film had totaled $19.3 million in South Korea. In its second weekend the film also made another $265,000 from 51 IMAX screens in six countries, becoming the highest grossing local-language title ever for IMAX in Singapore, Malaysia, and Vietnam with $1 million. By August 7, the film had grossed nearly $27 million in South Korea. The film made around $100,000 from 47 theaters from its Canadian debut, and $213,415 from 151 theaters the following weekend from its United States opening.

Critical response 
The website's critics consensus reads: "Although a disappointing sense of familiarity threatens to derail Train to Busan Presents: Peninsula, fans of the original may find it a thrilling enough ride." On Metacritic, the film has a weighted average score of 51 out of 100, based on 23 critics, indicating "mixed or average reviews".

Rob Hunter of Film School Rejects said the "film forgoes much of what makes Train to Busan so intensely affecting in favor of a somewhat more generic setting" but said "it's a fantastic idea blending a zombie movie with a heist film, and Yeon has fun with the concept."

Accolades

References

External links 

  at Well Go USA Entertainment
  at StudioCanal UK
 

2020 action films
2020 films
2020 horror films
2020s heist films
Films directed by Yeon Sang-ho
Films impacted by the COVID-19 pandemic
IMAX films
2020s Korean-language films
Next Entertainment World films
South Korean post-apocalyptic films
South Korean action horror films
South Korean action thriller films
South Korean heist films
South Korean horror thriller films
South Korean zombie films